Luke Tongue (born 25 January 1999), is a New Zealand professional footballer who plays as defender for Canterbury United.

Career
Tongue made his professional debut for Wellington Phoenix on 1 August 2017, playing the last 22 minutes of extra time in a 1–0 loss to Western Sydney Wanderers in the FFA Cup. On 24 January 2018, Tongue joined New Zealand Football Championship side Canterbury United.

References

External links

1999 births
Living people
Association football defenders
New Zealand association footballers
Sportspeople from Stafford
Wellington Phoenix FC players
Canterbury United players
New Zealand Football Championship players